Norman Dennis Newell (January 27, 1909 – April 18, 2005) was professor of geology at Columbia University, and chairman and curator of invertebrate paleontology at the American Museum of Natural History in New York City.

Personal life
Newell was born in Chicago, Illinois to Virgil Bingham and Nellie Newell. Shortly after he was born his family moved to Kansas. Newell's father encouraged his early interest in geology from a young age, often taking him to fossil deposits located in Kansas and Colorado. In 1929 at the age of 20 Newell received his B.S. degree from the University of Kansas, and his M.A. degree in 1931. He received his Ph.D. in geology from Yale University in 1933, where he was mentored by Charles Schuchert and Carl Dunbar.

Newell was twice married. His first marriage was to Valerie Zirkle on February 25, 1928. Newell married Zirkle while an undergraduate at the University of Kansas. Valerie Zirkle died in 1972. His second marriage was to Gillian W. Wormall on April 28, 1973. Wormall was a co-worker of Newell's at the American Museum of Natural History in New York.

Newell was also a talented saxophone player, and played in jazz bands to earn money through college. He briefly considered a career as a musician, but his intellectual interests moved him in a different direction.

Newell died at his home in Leonia, New Jersey on April 18, 2005 at the age of 96.

Scientific achievements
Newell was an eminent paleontologist and systematist of Upper Paleozoic and Mesozoic bivalves. He taught geology and paleontology at Columbia University from 1945 to 1977. During his tenure at Columbia he trained a number of students who later became prominent paleontologists, including Stephen Jay Gould, Niles Eldredge, Steven M. Stanley, Alan Cheetham, Alfred Fischer, and Don Boyd. Stephen Jay Gould remarked, "The work of graduate students is part of a mentor's reputation forever, because we trace intellectual lineages in this manner. I was Norman Newell's student, and everything that I ever do, as long as I live, will be read as his legacy."

An important part of Newell's research was the study of mass extinctions on the history of life, publishing on the topic well before the Alvarez hypothesis made such theorizing respectable.

Newell was a member of the National Academy of Sciences, the American Association for the Advancement of Science, and the American Philosophical Society. He was also the author of numerous scientific papers and several books including On Creation and Evolution, which criticized the arguments of creationists. In 1961 Newell was awarded the Mary Clark Thompson Medal from the National Academy of Sciences. His numerous awards include accolades from Yale University, the American Geological Institute, and the American Museum of Natural History.

Bibliography
Newell, N. D. (1952). "Periodicity in invertebrate evolution." Journal of Paleontology 26 (May): 371-385.
Newell, N. D. (1954). "Expedition to Raroia, Taumotus." Atol Research Bulletin 31 (Nov. 30): 1-109.
Newell, N. D. (1959). "The Nature of the Fossil Record." Proceedings, American Philosophical Society 103 (2): 264-285.
Newell, N. D. (1962). "Paleontological Gaps and Geochronology." Journal of Paleontology 36 (3): 592-610.
Newell, N. D. (1963). "Crises in the History of Life." Scientific American 208 (2): 76-92.
Newell, N. D. (1965). "Mass Extinctions at the End of the Cretaceous Period." Science 149 (27 August): 922-924.
Newell, N. D. (1967). "Revolutions in the History of Life." In Uniformity and Simplicity. Boulder CO: Geology Society of America, pp. 63–91.
Newell, N. D. and S. J. Gould, ed. (1980). Late Paleozoic Pelecypods: Pectinacea and Mytilacea. Salem, NH: Ayer Publishing.
Newell, N. D. (2001). "Half century later." In G.D. Stanley The History and Sedimentology of Ancient Reef Systems. New York: Springer Press, 205-216.

Notes

1909 births
2005 deaths
American curators
20th-century American geologists
Fellows of the American Association for the Advancement of Science
Members of the United States National Academy of Sciences
Penrose Medal winners
People associated with the American Museum of Natural History
People from Leonia, New Jersey
University of Kansas alumni
Yale University alumni